Bukeerere, sometimes wrongly spelled as Bukerere, is a township in the Central Region of Uganda. The correct phonetic spelling is with two 'e's after the 'k'.

Location
Bukeerere is in Mukono District, by road, northwest of Mukono, the headquarters of the district. The coordinates of Bukeerere are 0°24'27.0"N, 32°42'07.0"E (Latitude:0.407498; Longitude:32.701953).

Overview
The town of Bukeerere is the headquarters of Bukeerere parish, in Goma sub-county, Kyaggwe county. The Bukerere Road leads from Seeta on the Kampala–Jinja Highway through Bukeerere to join the Mukono-Kalagi Road at Kasaayi.

Settlers on this land are sitting tenants without land titles. They are expected to pay annual lease payments to the respective and owners.

References

External links
 Know Uganda: Stanislaus Mugwanya: the father of formal education in Uganda

Populated places in Central Region, Uganda
Cities in the Great Rift Valley
Mukono District